Lake Leavitt (not to be confused with Leavitt Lake, which is an alpine lake in Mono County) is a reservoir in Lassen County, California, United States. The  lake was created in 1889 from a natural sinkhole by Benjamin H. Leavitt. It is now part of the Honey Lake Valley irrigation system and managed by the Lassen Irrigation Company. The area is currently being remediated due to damage from cattle ranches, and is home to waterfowl, mule deer, pronghorn antelope, and other local species.

Construction
Leavitt's son, Victor E. Perry, worked on the dams construction. He tricked the workers of the dam to work harder and by planting a gold nugget at the lake, and when it was discovered, he declared all gold found by a miner was theirs to keep so long as work continued. workers worked far more in hopes of finding gold themselves, which led to them working more hours.

The Lassen Irrigation Company is now responsible for the three reservoirs of the area; Mccoy Flat, Hog Flat, and Lake Leavitt. Lake Leavitt is part of the Honey Lake Valley irrigation system to conserve storm water from Susan River the Mccoy Flat Reservoir releases from its storage of water.

Statistics

Lake Leavitt Dam is an earth dam constructed by the Lassen Irrigation Company. It is located at coordinates of 40.38 latitude and -120.50 longitude. The reservoir capacity is 7482 acres per feet. It has a res. area of 1142 acres and a drainage area of 9.3 miles squared.

Leavitt Lake Community Service District 
The Leavitt Lake Community Service District is a suburb of Susanville within Lassen County. They give sewer services to the people within this area, and are responsible for maintaining the sewer pipes. The population they give services to is under 1000 people. They have 2.5 miles of pipe ranging from 6 inches to 10 inches in diameter.

Leavitt Lake Ranches 
Other groups have sought to help the environment include the Leavitt Lake Ranches. The Wood family, part of the Leavitt Lake Ranches, was awarded the environmental stewardship award at the 2009 Cattle Industry Summer Conference. The Wood family grew their ranch slowly over time, allowing for integration between cattle and the endangered species found in the area to occur. They coordinated with Transportation Network Companies (TNC) and the Nature Conservancy to create a vernal pool restoration plan to increase the habitats for the threatened species. The species helped include waterfowl, mule deer, pronghorn antelope, and other local species. Other systems were put into place to reduce damages done to reduce erosion and allowed for nutritional testing of fecal matter from the livestock.

References 

1891 in California
Reservoirs in Lassen County, California